Raphael Wolf (born 29 December 1995) is an Austrian professional ice hockey defenseman currently playing for Black Wings Linz in the ICE Hockey League (ICEHL) and the Austrian national team.

Wolf played two seasons with the Dornbirn Bulldogs before leaving as a free agent and signing a one-year contract with fellow EBEL club, EHC Black Wings Linz on 27 May 2019.

He represented Austria at the 2019 IIHF World Championship.

References

External links

1995 births
Living people
Austrian ice hockey defencemen
EHC Black Wings Linz players
Dornbirn Bulldogs players
Sportspeople from Salzburg
EC VSV players
EK Zell am See players